The Electronic Entertainment Expo 2023 (E3 2023) will be the 27th E3, during which hardware manufacturers, software developers, and publishers from the video game industry will present new and upcoming products. The event, organized by the Entertainment Software Association (ESA), will take place at the Los Angeles Convention Center from June 13–16, 2023.

E3 2023 will be the first in person E3 event held since 2019. The 2020 and 2022 events were cancelled outright, while the 2021 event was held in a digital format. ReedPOP, which produces PAX festivals, New York Comic Con and Star Wars Celebration, will produce the event.

Press conferences

Ubisoft 
Ubisoft has been confirmed for this convention, though it is unknown if it will host a traditional press conference or an Ubisoft Forward video presentation.

Featured games 

The list of notable titles will appear after E3 2023.

Other events

Summer Game Fest 
Summer Game Fest will kick off with a live kickoff show on June 8, 2023, hosted by Geoff Keighley. It will continue throughout the month of June. Unlike in previous years where the event was virtually livestreamed, the event will be open to the general public.

Xbox Games Showcase 
Xbox will be hosting an Xbox Games Showcase on June 11, 2023. Another presentation, called "Starfield Direct" that is centered around the Bethesda game Starfield, will follow the showcase. Microsoft has confirmed that Xbox will not officially be on the E3 show floor, but will be co-streaming the event.

References 

2023 in Los Angeles
2023 in video gaming
2023
June 2023 events in the United States